Ali Sühan Demirel (born 2 January 2003) is a footballer who plays as a forward for Kasımpaşa. Born in Germany, he is a youth international for Turkey.

Professional career
Demirel is a youth product of the German clubs Preußen Münster and Bochum. He transferred to the Turkish club Kasımpaşa on 27 July 2022. He made his professional debut with Kasımpaşa as a substitute in a 1–0 Süper Lig loss to Kayserispor on 23 October 2022.

International career
Born in Germany, Demirel is of Turkish descent. He is a youth international for Turkey, having played up to the Turkey U19s.

References

External links
 
 
 

2003 births
Living people
People from Lünen
Turkish footballers
Turkey youth international footballers
German footballers
German people of Turkish descent
Kasımpaşa S.K. footballers
Süper Lig players
Association football forwards